Colette Grinevald (born 1947) is a French linguist. She earned her PhD from Harvard University in 1975 and joined the newly created Linguistics department at the University of Oregon in 1977. Grinevald has written grammars of Jakaltek Popti' and Rama and advocates for endangered languages. She contributed to UNESCO's language vitality criteria developed in 2003. Grinevald serves on Sorosoro's scientific board.

Life
Grinevald grew up in Algiers, in what was then French Algeria. She had recurrent tuberculosis as a young child. She married William Craig, then a medical student, while studying in Boston. The couple later divorced. Grinevald's children Matthias Craig and Guillaume Craig started a non-profit organization, Blue Energy.

Publications
 Jacaltec : The Structure of Jacaltec by Colette Grinevald Craig 1977, Austin : University of Texas Press

References

External links
Personal web page

1947 births
Living people
Linguists from France
Women linguists
Harvard University alumni
University of Oregon faculty